The JMC Yuhu 7 (江铃域虎7) is a mid-size pickup truck produced by Jiangling Motors for the Chinese market.

Overview
During the 2015 Shanghai Motor Show, Jiangling Motors showed off a concept called the Jiangling Yuhu concept that previewed the JMC Yuhu 7 pickup. 

The JMC Yuhu 7 pickup shares similar exterior design elements with the JMC Yuhu due to it being built on the same Jiangling platform. The Yuhu 7 is essentially an upgraded and restyled Yuhu, with the front and rear being the main difference. The Yuhu 7 is the second JMC vehicle to use the new JMC family front fascia that started with the JMC Teshun. 

The engine options of the Yuhu 7 includes a 2.0 liter turbo gasoline engine producing 205 horsepower and 325 N-m and a 2.4 liter turbo diesel engine producing 140 horsepower and 375 N-m.
The cargo bed size of the Yuhu 7 is 1475mm/1475mm/500mm.

JMC Yuhu 7 Fishing

The Yuhu 7 Fishing version is equipped with a deflector and a luggage rack, and is features LED light strips in the front. The rear part of the vehicle is refitted into a closed camper cabin, and the roof is integrated with a 2-meter-long and 1.2-meter-wide raised tent.

JMC Yuhu 7 Parent-child version

Similar to Yuhu 7 Fishing but focus more on family camping experience.

JMC Yuhu EV

An electric version of the Yuhu pickup was built based on the same design as the Yuhu 7 pickup called the T500EV or Yuhu EV. The Yuhu EV debuted during the 2019 Shanghai Auto Show in April 2019.

Specifications
The Yuhu EV sports a ground clearance of 225mm and a wheelbase of 3085m. The approach angle and the departure angle are both 28.5°. The electric motor of the Yuhu EV produces 120kW and 800N·m, and supports fast charging to have the vehicle charged within 1.5 hours. Two versions are available including a 320km range version and a 335km range extended version.

JMC Yuhu 9

The Yuhu 9 debuted during the 2019 Shanghai Auto Show in April 2019. The Yuhu 9 is essentially an upgraded and restyled Yuhu 7, with the front end being the main difference. The lone engine option of the Yuhu 9 is a 2.0 liter turbo gasoline engine producing 205 horsepower and 325 N-m.

References

External links
Official JMC Yuhu 7 website  

Trucks of China
Pickup trucks
All-wheel-drive vehicles
Rear-wheel-drive vehicles
Vehicles introduced in 2017